Aukrasanden is a village in Aukra Municipality in Møre og Romsdal county, Norway.  The village is located on the southeast side of the island of Gossa, just south of the village of Varhaugvika and the municipal centre of Falkhytta.  Just south of Aukrasanden is a ferry connection to the village of Hollingen which is located on the mainland across the Julsundet strait. Aukra Church is located in Aukrasanden. 

References

Aukra
Villages in Møre og Romsdal